The Australian Nurse of the Year Award was created to honour and showcase excellence in the nursing profession throughout Australia. It has become recognised as the highest civilian accolade for a nurse in Australia. There were 437,516 nurses registered to practice in Australia in 2021.

The award was established in 2003 to 2004 to recognise the exceptional contributions the recipient has made to improving care and outcomes for patients, providing excellent care in the face of adversity or other challenges, or for an outstanding act of kindness, understanding, compassion or courage, above and beyond the normal role as a nurse anywhere in Australia.

A judging panel of nationally recognised nursing experts assesses the top individual nominees and selects a nurse from each of Australia's states and territories. Each state or territory finalist is flown to a state capital (the place of ceremony is changed each year), where the winner is announced at a formal ceremony. In recent years, other categories of awards have been added. These are for an Outstanding Graduate and another is for Team Innovation.

Although the award is not associated with the Australian government-run Australian of the Year awards, it has been sponsored by various organisations and companies each year, including the Australian Department of Health and Ageing, The College of Nursing (Australia), Elsevier Medical Publications, the Australian Nursing Federation, Nursing Review, Laerdal, ME Bank, and other businesses. From their inception in 2004 the awards were hosted by Healthstaff Recruitment, and since 2007 by HESTA Superannuation Fund.

The awards attract wide coverage from media, culminating in a national presentation held each year, usually on or close to, 12 May, International Nurses' Day.

Past winners
2004 Andrew Cameron of Cue, Western Australia
2005 Catriona Chardon of Lismore, New South Wales (posthumously)
2006 Rosanne Squire of McLeans Ridge, New South Wales
2007 Robyn Williams of Wynnum, Queensland
2008 Sam Gibson of Subiaco, Western Australia
2009 Lyn Olsen of Dandenong, Victoria
2010 Charlotte Collins of Trigg, Western Australia
2011 Paul Esplin of Sydney
2012 Jenny Anderson of Rockhampton, Queensland
2013 Sara Lohmeyer of Perth, Western Australia
2014 Steve Brown of Melbourne
2015 Catrin Dittmar of Lake Macquarie, New South Wales
2016 Angie Monk of Joondalup, Western Australia
2017 Sarah Brown of Alice Springs, Northern Territory
2018 Gail Yarran of East Perth, Western Australia
2019 Professor Kate Curtis of Wollongong, New South Wales
2020 Tania Green of Monash, Victoria
2021 Shannon Philp of Sydney, New South Wales
2022 Sue Hegarty Melbourne, Victoria

References

Australian awards
Nursing in Australia
2003 establishments in Australia
Awards established in 2003
Nursing awards